

334001–334100 

|-bgcolor=#f2f2f2
| colspan=4 align=center | 
|}

334101–334200 

|-bgcolor=#f2f2f2
| colspan=4 align=center | 
|}

334201–334300 

|-bgcolor=#f2f2f2
| colspan=4 align=center | 
|}

334301–334400 

|-bgcolor=#f2f2f2
| colspan=4 align=center | 
|}

334401–334500 

|-bgcolor=#f2f2f2
| colspan=4 align=center | 
|}

334501–334600 

|-bgcolor=#f2f2f2
| colspan=4 align=center | 
|}

334601–334700 

|-bgcolor=#f2f2f2
| colspan=4 align=center | 
|}

334701–334800 

|-id=756
| 334756 Leövey ||  || Klára Leövey (1821–1897) was a famous Hungarian patriot, and a pioneer of women's education. She participated in the Hungarian Revolution of 1848, and because of this she was imprisoned. After her release, she became a headmistress of a girls' school. In her later years she was an active writer and journalist. || 
|}

334801–334900 

|-bgcolor=#f2f2f2
| colspan=4 align=center | 
|}

334901–335000 

|-bgcolor=#f2f2f2
| colspan=4 align=center | 
|}

References 

334001-335000